The Environmental Foundation for Africa (EFA) is a non-governmental organization that aims to protect and restore the environment in West Africa. It was founded in 1992 in the United Kingdom as the Environmental Foundation for Sierra Leone (ENFOSAL) and began operations in Sierra Leone in 1993. During the height of the war years, the organisation was established in Liberia under its current name. EFA Sierra Leone (EFA-SL) is operating as the local partner to the international NGO EFA.

Environmental organisations based in Sierra Leone
Nature conservation organizations based in Africa
Conservation and environmental foundations